Dushman (English: Enemy) is a 1990 Hindi film starring Mithun Chakraborty and Mandakini as the lead protagonists. The film is directed and produced by Shakti Samanta based on the story of Shaktipada Rajguru. The film was commercially unsuccessful, yet, its Bengali version Andho Bichar became highly commercially successful.

Plot

A story of a father and son separated because of the frauds of the leader of a local gang in the years when the son was a child. The young man by the name of Rakesh (nicknamed "Bullet"), appears as the tool in hands of experienced gangsters, and rises, not knowing that his father has decided to take justice into his own hands and take revenge for the family tragedy.

Cast
 Alok Nath as Rakesh's father
 Mithun Chakraborty as Rakesh 
 Sadashiv Amrapurkar as Kalicharan
 Mandakini
 Deepa Sahi as Geeta
 Ranjeet
 Bob Christo

Music 
Music: R.D. Burman
Lyrics: Indivar

References

External links
 

1990s Hindi-language films
1990 films
Films directed by Shakti Samanta
Films scored by R. D. Burman

Hindi remakes of Bengali films
Films based on works by Shaktipada Rajguru